Dharwad, also known as Dharwar, is a city located in the north western part of the Indian state of Karnataka. It is the headquarters of the Dharwad district of Karnataka and forms a contiguous urban area with the city of Hubballi. It was merged with Hubballi in 1962 to form the twin cities of Hubballi-Dharwad.

In 2016, Hubli-Dharwad was selected for solar city / green city master plans. In 2017, government of India included Hubli-Dharwad city for a smart city project, a flagship scheme for overall development of infrastructure in the twin-cities.

Etymology
The word "Dharwad" is derived from the Sanskrit word 'dwarawata', 'dwara' meaning "door" and 'wata' or 'wada' meaning "town". It means a place of rest in a long travel or a small habitation. For centuries, Dharwad acted as a resting place for travellers and a gateway between the Malenadu (western mountains) and the Bayalu Seeme (plains).

History 

The Chalukyas ruled Dharwad during the 12th century. A stone inscription indicates that there was a ruler by the name of BhaskaraDeva in 1117. In the 14th century, the district was first overrun by the Bahmani Sultanate, after which it was annexed to the newly established Hindu kingdom of Vijayanagar, an official of which named "Dhar Rao", according to local tradition, built the fort at Dharwad town in 1403. After the defeat of the king of Vijayanagar in the Battle of Talikota (1565), Dharwad was for a few years practically independent under its Hindu governor; but in 1573 the fort was captured by the sultan of Bijapur, Adil Shah, and Dharwad was annexed to his dominions. Adil Shah built a fort in an area later called Manna Killa, and later Nazratabad. With this fort, the strategic importance of Dharwad increased and it attracted the attention of subsequent conquerors, including Aurangzeb, Shivaji, Aurangzeb's son Bahadur Shah I, Peshwa Balaji Baji Rao, Hyder Ali, Tipu Sultan and finally the British colonizers.

In 1685, the fort was taken by the Mughal emperor Aurangzeb, and Dharwad, on the break-up of the Mughal empire, fell under the sway of the Maratha Peshwa of Pune. In 1764, the province was overrun by Hyder Ali of the Mysore, who in 1778 captured the fort of Dharwad. The fort was retaken in 1791 by the Marathas. After the final defeat of the Peshwa by the British in 1818, Dharwar was incorporated into the territory of the British East India Company's Bombay Presidency. During the early 19th century, when the British were expanding their domains, they faced a lot of opposition from local rulers, including Baba Saheb of Nargund and Kittur Chennamma.

Geography

Climate 

Hubli-Dharwad has a tropical wet and dry climate. Summers are hot and dry, lasting from late February to early June. They are followed by the monsoon season, with moderate temperatures and a large amount of precipitation. Temperatures are fairly moderate from late October to early February, with virtually no rainfall. Dharwad is 750 meters above sea level.

Demographics

The population of the twin cities as per provisional figures of Census 2011 is 943,857 and is urban. Hubli-Dharwad's population increased 22.99% between 1981 and 1991, from 527,108 to 648,298, and by 21.2% between 1991 and 2001.

Culture
Dharwad has earned the reputation of being called as 'Cultural Capital of Karnataka'. Dharwad Region's Cultural Life blossomed with some of the finest Poets, Writers, and Thinkers at the beginning 20th century. Hindustani Classical Music is a genre that inspires a possessive devotion among people from the region. Dharwad city is known for karnatic music, art culture, musicians, poets, writers and Cuisine.

Literature 
Dharwad has nurtured some of the best writers in Kannada, has many iconic places that bear an association with the Language and State’s Culture. Karnataka Vidyavardhaka Sangha also played a crucial role in bringing literary enthusiasts together.

Places such as Sadhankeri in front of Varakavi D R Bendre’s house is that serene location from which the poet drew inspiration to write his poems.

Dharwad has the reputation of earning 3(out of 8) Jnanapeeta Award to Karnataka. Da Ra Bendre, V.K.Gokak, Girish Karnad.

Dattatreya Ramachandra Bendre popularly known as Da Ra Bendre is generally considered as one of the greatest Kannada lyric poets of the 20th century. Da Ra Bendre wrote with the pen name ‘Ambikatanayadatta’. Da Ra Bendre described Sadhankeri as a place of inspiration for his poems praising the beauty of nature. He was honored with the Padma Shri award in 1968 and his collection of poems ‘Naaku Tanti’ earned him the Jnanapeeta Award.
Vinayaka Krishna Gokak (VK Gokak) was a major writer in the Kannada language and a scholar of English and Kannada Literatures. His epic ‘Bharatha Sindhu Rashmi’ has earned him Jnanapeeta Award in 1990. He completed his education in Majid High School, Savanur, and attended the Karnataka College, Dharwad where he studied Literature.
Girish Karnad was an Indian Actor, Film Director, and Kannada writer. He was awarded the Jnanapeeta award for his immense contributions to Kannada Literature and Theatre in 1998. Girish Karnad had earned a Bachelor of Arts(B.A) degree in Mathematics and Statistics from Karnatak Arts College, Dharwad (affiliated to Karnataka University).

Fine Arts
D V Halbhavi established Halbhavi School of Art, Dharwad which has the distinction of being Karnataka’s first school of Arts in the year 1935. The school, which was founded under the aegis of Dharwad Fine Art Society, has provided Art education to thousands of students during the last 76 years. The school also introduces students to complementary fields such as theatre, literature, and music. Kumareshwara Fine Arts College (1991) was founded by K.N. Neglurumatha at Haveri. V.R. Sutar started Gangambika Memorial Art School (1993) at Dharwad. Apart from this in 1966, Dandavathi Math in Dharwad opened an Arts School for mentally challenged children.

Recognizing the immense contribution of Dharwad towards the Music, Literature, and Arts field, Central Government has decided to set up Lalitha Kala Akademy Regional Centre in Dharwad. The Lalitha Kala Akademy will act as a catalyst for artists to get equal exposure as some of the bigger cities artists get and will make Art Field more vibrant in North Karnataka region.

Cuisine

Jolada rotti is a very popular and very common diet in  Dharwad city it is part of the staple diet of most of the districts of North Karnataka, where it is eaten with pulse curries such as jhunka, yengai, shenga chutney or other assorted chutnies. Jowar rotti is also called as jawarichi bhakri in neighbouring Maharastra.

Dharwad peda is a sweet delicacy prepared of milk and sugar which has been accorded Geographical Indication.

Hubli-Dharwad Municipal Corporation

Hubli-Dharwad Municipal Corporation (HDMC) was constituted in 1962 by combining the two cities separated by a distance of 20 kilometres.  The area covered by the corporation is spread over 45 revenue villages and is the second-largest city corporation in Karnataka state.  The population of the city as per the 1991 census was 700,000. The population of Hubli-Dharwad is 1,158,000 (2020). Hubli Municipal Council was established under the Government of India Act of 1850, and the Dharwad Municipal Council first came into existence on 1 January 1856. Both were merged later forming Hubli-Dharwad Municipal Corporation (HDMC) The headquarters of HDMC is situated in Hubballi, comprising 82 members covering four Vidhan Sabha Constituencies of Hubli-Dharwad. There has been a huge demand by people of Dharwad to create a separate civic body and get itself detached by HDMC. Claims are that most of the funds are allocated to Hubli solely.

Transport

Road 

Hubballi-Dharwad BRTS (also known as HDBRTS) is a bus rapid transit system built to serve the twin cities of Hubli and Dharwad, located in the North-Western part of Karnataka state in India. Hubli-Dharwad BRTS (HDBRTS) project is a Government of Karnataka initiative to foster long-term economic growth in the region. The project promotes fast, safe, comfortable, convenient and affordable public transportation between the twin cities and aims to reduce congestion and air pollution in the region. But it has severely affected the private traffic, by restricting the lanes. Many don't approve the project, as BRTS system has failed in many cities across India, for example both in Pune and Delhi.

The BRTS corridor includes segregated bus lanes, access-controlled bus stations, physical and fare integration with BRT feeder services, off-board ticketing through smart cards and bar-coded paper tickets, intelligent transport system and high-quality buses (Standard AC buses). The corridor is designed for operating regular and express services. It consists of two lanes for BRTS buses on either side of the median bus station facilitating overtaking lanes for express services. Foot overbridges at six locations, PELICAN signals, and synchronised signal management are proposed to facilitate the easy approach of passengers to bus stations.

Air 

Hubli Airport  is the nearest airport that serves the twin cities of Hubli-Dharwad and North Karnataka in the state of Karnataka, India. It is the third busiest airport in Karnataka and the 45th busiest airport in India. In March 2020, Hubli airport received the best airport award under government of India's Regional connectivity scheme. Hubli airport connects to 10 destinations throughout the country. Efforts are being made to make Hubli Airport as international Airport.

Media 

Mangaluru Samachar was the first ever Kannada language news paper distributed in Dharwad, along with region of North Canara.

In current times the newspapers include Vijaya Karnataka, Vijayavani, Kannada Prabha, Prajavani and Samyukta Karnataka, in Kannada; The Hindu, Times of India, Deccan Herald and The Indian Express in English.

Sports
Cricket and football are the most popular sports in Dharwad and often played in grounds and streets of the city.

Cricket

Karnataka State Cricket Association (ASCA) has organised few professional district level and state level cricket matches in Kittur Rani Chennamma cricket stadium, KCD and SDM cricket ground, Sattur.

RN Shetty Stadium stadium has hosted a Ranji Trophy match in 1990 when Karnataka cricket team played against Hyderabad cricket team.

Kabbadi
Major kabaddi matches are usually held at the Karnatak college ground.

Tennis
Tennis has been a popular choice among millennials in the city. In 2003 and 2006 Dharwad hosted the International men's tennis tournament ATP Challenger Series.

Civic administration 

Hubli-Dharwad Municipal Corporation (HDMC) was constituted in 1962 by combining two cities separated by a distance of 20 kilometers. The population of the city as per the 1991 census was 7 lakhs. The population of Hubli-Dharwad is 943,857 according to 2011 Census. There has been a huge demand by people of Dharwad to create a separate civic body and get itself detached by HDMC.Claims are that most of the funds are allocated to Hubli solely.

Hubli: Under the Government of India Act of 1850, the Hubli-Municipal council was established on 15 August 1855.
Dharwad: The Dharwad Municipal Council first came into existence on 1 January 1856. The first non-official President of the council was S.K. Rodda in 1907, and Shri S.V. Mensinkai, was nominated in the following year.  But the credit of being the first elected president goes to Shri S.G. Karigudari, who took office in 1920.

Hubli is well known as a commercial as well as industrial centre, whereas Dharwad is seat of learning.  Popularly believed that, it is this diversity and geographical positions that the state government amalgamated the two cities. The twin-city corporation occupies unique place in Karnataka State. After the capital city of Bangalore, this is the largest city Corporation in the State.

Educational institutions 

Dharwad hosts many Universities, Colleges and Autonomous Institutions, some are listed below.
 Indian Institute of Information Technology, Dharwad (IIITDWD) - One of 25 IIITs, it was established in 2015.
 Indian Institute of Technology Dharwad (IIT Dharwad) - One of 23 IITs, it was established in 2016.
 Karnatak University - established in 1949.
 University of Agricultural Sciences, Dharwad (UASD) - established in 1986.
 Dakshina Bharat Hindi Prachar Sabha, Dharwad provincial branch. In 1964, the institution was recognized by the Indian Government as one of the Institutes of National Importance.
 Dharwad Institute of Mental Health and Neurosciences (DIMHANS) - established in 1845.
 Karnatak College - established in 1917.
Sri Dharmasthala Manjunatheshwara College of Engineering and Technology, Dharwad - established in 1979.

Villages 
 
 
 Sangameshwara, Kalaghatagi

References

External links 

 Hubli – Dharwad Municipal Corporation
 
 Karnataka State Government Gazetteer, Info on Hubli
 City population
 Hubli-Dharwad city profiles
 All about Hubli Dharwad

Articles containing potentially dated statements from 2001
All articles containing potentially dated statements
 
Cities and towns in Dharwad district
Cities in Karnataka